Life Begins with Love is a 1937 American romantic drama film, directed by Ray McCarey. It stars Jean Parker, Douglass Montgomery, and Edith Fellows.

References

External links
Life Begins with Love at the Internet Movie Database

1937 films
American romantic drama films
1937 romantic drama films
Films directed by Ray McCarey
American black-and-white films
Columbia Pictures films
Films scored by Morris Stoloff
1930s American films